This is a list of singles that have peaked in the Top 10 of the Billboard Hot 100 during 1975.

Elton John scored four top ten hits during the year with "Lucy in the Sky with Diamonds", "Philadelphia Freedom", "Someone Saved My Life Tonight", and "Island Girl", the most among all other artists.

Top-ten singles

1974 peaks

1976 peaks

See also
 1975 in music
 List of Hot 100 number-one singles of 1975 (U.S.)
 Billboard Year-End Hot 100 singles of 1975

References

General sources

Joel Whitburn Presents the Billboard Hot 100 Charts: The Seventies
Additional information obtained can be verified within Billboard's online archive services and print editions of the magazine.

1975
United States Hot 100 Top 10